Metaeuchromius yuennanensis is a moth in the family Crambidae. It was described by Aristide Caradja in 1937. It is found in China (Yunnan, Tibet).

Subspecies
Metaeuchromius yuennanensis yuennanensis (Yunnan)
Metaeuchromius yuennanensis tibetanus Bleszynski, 1965 (Tibet)

References

Crambinae
Moths described in 1937